Éric Guillemain is a French Photographer born in Morocco. He has worked with Peter Lindbergh and has famously photographed Vanessa Paradis for Vs. Magazine.

Early career
In 2002 Eric Guillemain moved from Paris to New York where he tried to make it as a musician. In 2004 he started working as a photographer's assistant and by 2008 had decided to move into photography full-time.

References

External links
[https://www.instagram.com/ericguillemainphoto/?hl=en

French photographers
Living people
Photographers from New York City
Fashion photographers
Year of birth missing (living people)